Hervé Juvin (born 29 January 1956), is a French politician who was elected as a Member of the European Parliament in 2019.

He is author of the book The Coming of the Body, which examines the effects of longer human life spans on society and the individual.

References

Living people
MEPs for France 2019–2024
National Rally (France) MEPs
1956 births